Bridge Brook Pond is located southeast of Mount Arab, New York. Fish species present in the lake are white sucker, brook trout, and black bullhead. There is trail access from the west shore of Tupper Lake.

References

Lakes of New York (state)
Lakes of St. Lawrence County, New York